The 1904 Washington gubernatorial election was held on November 8, 1904.

Republican nominee Albert E. Mead defeated Democratic nominee George Turner and Socialist nominee David Burgess, with 51.34% of the vote.

General election

Candidates
Major party candidates
Albert E. Mead, Republican, former member of the Washington House of Representatives
George Turner, Democratic, former U.S. Senator

Other candidates
Ambrose H. Sherwood, Prohibition, Prohibition nominee for Washington's at-large congressional district in 1902
David Burgess, Socialist, Socialist nominee for Washington's at-large congressional district in 1902
William McCormick, Socialist Labor, Socialist Labor nominee for Governor in 1900 and for Washington's at-large congressional district in 1902

Results

References

Bibliography
  
 

1904
Washington
Gubernatorial